Anil Kumar Gupta is an Indian scholar in the area of grassroots innovations. He is the founder of the Honey Bee Network. He retired as a full-time professor at the Indian Institute of Management, Ahmedabad in 2017, where he served for about 36 years.

He held an executive vice-chair at the National Innovation Foundation. He is also a fellow of the World Academy of Art and Science. He was awarded the Padma Shri in 2004 for his contributions to management education.

Gupta has developed courses for students at the Indian Institute of Management, Ahmedabad. One of his most popular courses included Shodh Yatra, (meaning 'research walk'), under which he took management students to different parts of the country to learn from local communities and study their knowledge systems. This course was derived from his larger concept of walking through the length and breadth of the country, interacting with farmers, traditional knowledge holders, grassroots innovators, innovative students, etc. It started in May 1998 in the western Indian province of Gujarat.

Education 
Upon finishing his bachelor's degree (Hons) in Agriculture, he went on to complete his Masters in Sciences (Biochemical Genetics) from Haryana Agricultural University in 1974. In 1986, he earned a Ph.D. in Management from the Kurukshetra University.

Research
He is a Co-Ordinator of SRISTI (Society for Research and Initiative for Sustainable Technologies and Institutions). He was a speaker at TED India in November 2009.  Since 2011, he is an advisor on issues pertaining to innovation, environment, and sustainability to Fair Observer, an online magazine covering global issues.

Awards and honours

References

External links
IIM Ahmedabad 
Prof. Anil K. Gupta 
Presentation page on Indian Institute of Management
Interview with Anil Gupta on Grassroots Innovation in India

Living people
Academic staff of the Indian Institute of Management Ahmedabad
Recipients of the Padma Shri in literature & education
TWAS laureates
Year of birth missing (living people)
Business educators